Wide Country may refer to:
 Wide Country (horse), an American Thoroughbred racehorse
 Wide Country (TV series), an American Western television series 
 Wide Country Stakes, an American Thoroughbred horse race, named for the horse